Malan Bridge, also called Pul-i-Malan, is a two-lane arched bridge over the Hari River, connecting Injil District with Guzara District, both in Afghanistan. It was built around 1110 AD. It is currently made up of 22 arches and has survived several floods that have washed away other bridges crossing the Hari.

History 
A common legend about its creation says the mythical princesses Bibi Nur and Bibi Hur built the bridge around AD 900. They were followers of Zoroastrianism. The sisters had poultry, so they mixed egg shells with clay and, with much effort, constructed the bridge stronger than steel.

The bridge was built during the reign of Seljuk Sultan Ahmad Sanjar in 11101112 AD. The Mughal emperor Babur included it in his visit to the city in 1506. A tourist, Alexander Hamilton wrote that the bridge had 17 arches in the late 19th century; the bridge currently has 22. The bridge was also reported to be neglected and falling into decay in the late 19th century. By 1972, part of the bridge had been washed out and was impassable.

A modern bridge was built upstream in 1961–62 (SH 1340). Prior to that construction, Pul-i Malan was the only bridge connecting Herat and Kandahar and was considered important because of that. The bridge was partially destroyed during the Soviet–Afghan War, with two guard towers crumbled and 5 arches demolished. The Danish Committee for Aid to Afghan Refugees rebuilt the bridge using concrete and baked bricks, strengthening the foundation and roadway in the process. The bridge reopened for crossing in 1995.

References

External links 
United Nations photo of Pul-i Malan (on Flickr)
Page on archnet.org

Buildings and structures in Herat
Bridges in Afghanistan
Bridges completed in the 12th century
Bridges completed in the 1990s